Alexicles was an Athenian general who belonged to the oligarchial or Lacedaemonian party at Athens. After the Athenian coup of 411 BC, he and several of his friends left the city and went to their friends at Decelea, but he was afterwards made prisoner in Piraeus and sentenced to death for his participation in the guilt of Phrynichus.

References 

5th-century BC Athenians
Ancient Athenian generals
People executed by ancient Athens